The Ranksters was a South Korean variety show program on tvN. It was aired on tvN on Wednesdays at 23:00 (KST).

Cast

Ranking Market Employees 
 Boom
 Lee Si-won

Anything Friends 
 Moon Se-yoon
 
 Yang Se-hyung
 Park Na-rae
 Yang Se-chan

Synopsis

Episode 1-5
This show features 2 segments, namely "No Matter What Ranking Mart" and "Taste Detective Friends". The cast will be split into pairs, while the guests will form their own pair.

In the first segment, "No Matter What Ranking Mart", the pairs compete to answer different themes Top 5 (out of 30 items), based on actual surveys conducted in Korea, such as "Top 5 items that you will be reluctant to buy using your own money but other people are thankful for when gifted to them as presents from you". If a pair chose an item that is not under the Top 5, they will have to pay for the item with their own credit cards. The pair that guessed the most number of correct Top 5 items will have their spending deducted to zero. From episode 4, the pairs will have to answer just the top 3, out of 20 items.

In the second segment, "Taste Detective Friends", they will move to the Food Court. There will be a food theme for each episode, and there are a number of versions of the food out of the versions shown above that are actually being sold, while the rest of the versions are made by the production team. The pairs have to play games to get to choose first, as they each attempt to guess which are the real versions, while trying their own choices. If he/she guesses correctly he/she will not have to pay for these food products using their own credit cards.

The money spent by the cast will be used to purchase the items to be used for future episodes.

Episode 6-8
New segments are introduced, in addition to the current segments shown in the first 5 episodes. The main objective for each episode is to pick each episode's Employee of the Week, which is through the competition between the cast and the 2 guests each week.

 Guess the titles of the songs that are played at the same time. 
 Charades. For only episode 6, the English words speed quiz was played with a foreigner. Each side has 100 seconds to explain as many words as they can to the foreigner in English.
 Guess the correct song and its singer based on its music video which would play a different song from the music video.
 A slightly modified version of "Taste Detective Friends". For each round, 4 types of food are shown and each team has to choose only 1 type of food they think is actually sold.

Episodes 
 Pair A consists of Park Na-rae and Yang Se-chan
 Pair B consists of Hwang Je-sung and Yang Se-hyung
 Pair C consists of Moon Se-yoon and Hong Yoon-hwa
 Guests will form Pair D

 Pair A consists of Park Na-rae and Yang Se-chan
 Pair B consists of Moon Se-yoon and Yang Se-hyung
 Pair C consists of Hong Yoon-hwa and Hwang Je-sung
 Guests will form Pair D

 Pair A consists of Park Na-rae and Yang Se-chan
 Pair B consists of Hwang Je-sung and Yang Se-hyung
 Pair C consists of Moon Se-yoon and Hong Yoon-hwa
 Guests will form Pair D

Ratings 
 Ratings listed below are the individual corner ratings of The Ranksters. (Note: Individual corner ratings do not include commercial time, which regular ratings include.)

2019

Notes

References

External links 
 Official website 

South Korean variety television shows
South Korean television shows
TVN (South Korean TV channel) original programming
Korean-language television shows
2019 South Korean television series debuts